The 2006 All-Ireland Minor Hurling Championship was the 76th staging of the All-Ireland Minor Hurling Championship since its establishment by the Gaelic Athletic Association in 1928. The championship began on 1 April 2006 and ended on 3 September 2006

Galway entered the championship as the defending champions in search of a third successive title.

On 3 September 2006 Tipperary won the championship following a 2-18 to 2-07 defeat of Galway in the All-Ireland final. This was their 17th All-Ireland title overall and their first title since 1996.

Kilkenny's Richie Hogan was the championship's top scorer with 5-38.

Results

Leinster Minor Hurling Championship

Group A

Group B

Quarter-finals

Semi-finals

Final

Munster Minor Hurling Championship

First round

Play-off

Semi-finals

Final

Ulster Minor Hurling Championship

Semi-final

Final

All-Ireland Minor Hurling Championship

Quarter-finals

Semi-finals

Final

Championship statistics

Top scorers

Top scorer overall

References

External links
 Full list of results for the 2007 championship

Minor
All-Ireland Minor Hurling Championship